Gursken Church is a parish church of the Church of Norway in the municipality of Sande in Møre og Romsdal county, Norway. It is located in the village of Gursken on the island of Gurskøya. It is one of the two churches for the Gursken parish which is part of the Søre Sunnmøre prosti (deanery) in the Diocese of Møre. The white, wooden church was built in a long church design in 1919 using plans drawn up by the architect Eduard Carlén. The church seats about 270 people.

History
The parish received permission to build a church in Gursken in 1918. The parish hired the Swedish architect Eduard Carlén, who is best known for having designed a large number of tenements in Kristiania in the 1890s. The wooden long church was built in 1918-1919. It was formally consecrated on 5 November 1919.

See also
List of churches in Møre

References

Sande, Møre og Romsdal
Churches in Møre og Romsdal
Long churches in Norway
Wooden churches in Norway
20th-century Church of Norway church buildings
Churches completed in 1919
1919 establishments in Norway